see also George Hassell (disambiguation)

  
 

George Hassell (born Alfred Kenedon Jeffrys Halse; 4 May 1881 – 17 February 1937) was an English actor who had roles in Captain Blood (1935), La Bohème (1926), and Becky Sharp (1935). He died of a heart attack in Chatsworth, California, age 55.

Filmography

References

External links 
 

1881 births
1937 deaths
American male film actors
20th-century American male actors
British emigrants to the United States